Francesco Maria Grimaldi, SJ (2 April 1618 – 28 December 1663) was an Italian Jesuit priest, mathematician and physicist who taught at the Jesuit college in Bologna.  He was born in Bologna to Paride Grimaldi and Anna Cattani.

Work
Between 1640 and 1650, working with Riccioli, he investigated the free fall of objects, confirming that the distance of fall was proportional to the square of the time taken. Grimaldi and Riccioli also made a calculation of gravity at the earth's surface by recording the oscillations of an accurate pendulum.

In astronomy, he built and used instruments to measure lunar mountains as well as the height of clouds, and drew an accurate map or, selenograph, which was published by Riccioli and now adorns the entrance to the National Air and Space Museum in Washington D.C.

He was the first to make accurate observations on the diffraction of light (although by some accounts Leonardo da Vinci had earlier noted it), and coined the word 'diffraction'.  Through experimentation he was able to demonstrate that the observed passage of light could not be reconciled with the idea that it moved in a rectilinear path. Rather, the light that passed through the hole took on the shape of a cone. Later physicists used his work as evidence that light was a wave, significantly, Dutch mathematician Christiaan Huygens. He also discovered what are known as diffraction bands.

The crater Grimaldi on the Moon is named after him.

Publications

See also
List of Jesuit scientists
List of Roman Catholic scientist-clerics

References

External links

 
 Grimaldi's (1665) Physico-mathesis de lumine - digital facsimile from the Linda Hall Library

1618 births
1663 deaths
17th-century Italian Jesuits
17th-century Italian mathematicians
17th-century Italian physicists
Selenographers
Jesuit scientists